The following is the qualification system and qualified athletes for the boxing at the 2019 Pan American Games competitions.

Qualification system
A total of 120 boxers will qualify to compete at the games (eight per event). The host nation (Peru) received seven automatic qualification spots (five men and two women). The remainder of the spots were awarded at the Pan American Games qualifier held in Managua, Nicaragua in April 2019.

Qualification timeline

Qualification summary
The following is a summary of qualified countries per event.

Men

Men's 49 kg

Men's 52 kg

Men's 56 kg

Men's 60 kg

Men's 64 kg

Men's 69 kg

Men's 75 kg

Men's 81 kg

Men's 91 kg

Men's +91 kg

Women

Women's 51 kg

Women's 57 kg

Women's 60 kg

Women's 69 kg

Women's 75 kg

References

P
Qualification for the 2019 Pan American Games
Boxing at the 2019 Pan American Games